Ruhl Maulsby (October 18, 1923 – February 24, 1996) was an American politician who served in the Iowa House of Representatives from 1979 to 1993.

References

1923 births
1996 deaths
Republican Party members of the Iowa House of Representatives
20th-century American politicians